1977 Revisited – a Collection of Rare Tracks and B-Sides is a compilation CD by The Clash, released in the US in 1990 on Relativity Records via CBS Special Products and compiled by Anthony Valentino.

The CD contains four of the five songs that were deleted from the American edition of The Clash (excluding the original version of "White Riot"), two non-LP songs from The Cost of Living, 3 B-sides and a live song.

All songs except "London's Burning" later appeared on Clash on Broadway, and later all songs (including "London's Burning") appeared on the various singles in Singles Box.

The CD cover features a reprint of an article by Mick Farren originally published in Soho News while the insert contains a brief essay by Ira Robbins that describes the original sources of the track selection. Many of the songs released are considered original releases.

Track listing

References

External links
A Collection of Rare Tracks and B Sides by The Clash Reviews and Ratings. Rate Your Music.
1977 Revisited at Discogs

1990 compilation albums
The Clash compilation albums
CBS Records compilation albums
Relativity Records compilation albums